is a railway station on the Iwate Ginga Railway Line in the town of Ichinohe, Iwate Prefecture, Japan, operated by the third-sector railway operator Iwate Ginga Railway Company.

Lines
Kozuya Station is served by the Iwate Ginga Railway Line, and is located 59.8 kilometers from the starting point of the line at Morioka Station and 595.1 kilometers from Tokyo Station.

Station layout
Kozuya Station has one island platform and a single side platform connected to the station building by a footbridge. The station is staffed.

Platforms

Adjacent stations

History
Kozuya Station opened on 1 September 1891. The station was absorbed into the JR East network upon the privatization of Japanese National Railways (JNR) on 1 April 1987, and was transferred to the Iwate Ginga Railway on 1 September 2002.

Passenger statistics
In fiscal 2015, the station was used by an average of 130 passengers daily.

Surrounding area
Kozuya Post Office
Mabechi River
Kozuya Elementary School

See also
 List of Railway Stations in Japan

References

External links

  

Railway stations in Iwate Prefecture
Iwate Galaxy Railway Line
Railway stations in Japan opened in 1891
Ichinohe, Iwate